Deborah Davis is a British screenwriter known for The Favourite (2019).

Davis has a background in practicing law and journalism. She wrote the first draft of what would become The Favourite  in 1998, under the original title The Balance of Power, and earned an MA from the University of East Anglia. The Favourite was nominated for numerous awards and accolades. She submitted the story to producer Ceci Dempsey and Ed Guiney, who brought in director Yorgos Lanthimos. Lanthimos introduced Davis to Tony McNamara to help polish the screenplay.

In 2021 it was announced that Davis was writing a television series based on the life of Marie Antoinette. The Canal+ and BBC production was filmed in France in locations that included Versailles and Vaux-le-Vicomte.

Writing credits

Awards and nominations 

The Favourite

References

External links
 

Living people
British television writers
Year of birth missing (living people)
British women screenwriters
British women television writers
Alumni of the University of East Anglia